SNOMED CT or SNOMED Clinical Terms is a systematically organized computer-processable collection of medical terms providing codes, terms, synonyms and definitions used in clinical documentation and reporting. SNOMED CT is considered to be the most comprehensive, multilingual clinical healthcare terminology in the world. The primary purpose of SNOMED CT is to encode the meanings that are used in health information and to support the effective clinical recording of data with the aim of improving patient care. SNOMED CT provides the core general terminology for electronic health records. SNOMED CT comprehensive coverage includes: clinical findings, symptoms, diagnoses, procedures, body structures, organisms and other etiologies, substances, pharmaceuticals, devices and specimens.

SNOMED CT is maintained and distributed by SNOMED International, an international non-profit standards development organization, located in London, UK. SNOMED International is the trading name of the International Health Terminology Standards Development Organisation (IHTSDO), established in 2007.

SNOMED CT provides for consistent information interchange and is fundamental to an interoperable electronic health record. It provides a consistent means to index, store, retrieve, and aggregate clinical data across specialties and sites of care. It also helps in organizing the content of electronic health records systems by reducing the variability in the way data are captured, encoded and used for clinical care of patients and research. SNOMED CT can be used to directly record clinical details of individuals in electronic patient records. It also provides the user with a number of linkages to clinical care pathways, shared care plans and other knowledge resources, in order to facilitate informed decision-making, and to support long-term patient care. The availability of free automatic coding tools and services, which can return a ranked list of SNOMED CT descriptors to encode any clinical report, could help healthcare professionals to navigate the terminology.

SNOMED CT is a terminology that can cross-map to other international standards and classifications. Specific language editions are available which augment the international edition and can contain language translations, as well as additional national terms. For example, SNOMED CT-AU, released in December 2009 in Australia, is based on the international version of SNOMED CT, but encompasses words and ideas that are clinically and technically unique to Australia.

History 
SNOMED started in 1965 as a Systematized Nomenclature of Pathology (SNOP) and was further developed into a logic-based health care terminology.

SNOMED CT was created in 1999 by the merger, expansion and restructuring of two large-scale terminologies: SNOMED Reference Terminology (SNOMED RT), developed by the College of American Pathologists (CAP); and the Clinical Terms Version 3 (CTV3) (formerly known as the Read codes), developed by the National Health Service of the United Kingdom (NHS). The final product was released in January 2002. The International Health Terminology Standards Development Organisation now considers SNOMED CT to be a brand name rather than an acronym. Previously SNOMED was an acronym for Systematized Nomenclature Of Medicine, but it lost that meaning when SNOMED was combined with CTV3 (Clinical Terms Version 3) into the merged product called SNOMED Clinical Terms, which was shortened to SNOMED CT.

The historical strength of SNOMED was its coverage of medical specialties. SNOMED RT, with over 120,000 concepts, was designed to serve as a common reference terminology for the aggregation and retrieval of pathology health care data recorded by multiple organizations and individuals. The strength of CTV3 was its terminologies for general practice. CTV3, with 200,000 interrelated concepts, was used for storing structured information about primary care encounters in individual, patient-based records. The January 2020 release of the SNOMED CT International Edition included more than 350,000 concepts.

In July 2003, the National Library of Medicine (NLM), on behalf of the United States Department of Health and Human Services, entered into an agreement with the College of American Pathologists to make SNOMED CT available to U.S. users at no cost through the National Library of Medicine's Unified Medical Language System UMLS Metathesaurus. The NLM negotiation team was led by Betsy Humphreys, and the contract provided NLM with a perpetual license for the core SNOMED CT (in Spanish and English) and its ongoing updates.

In April 2007, SNOMED CT intellectual property rights were transferred from the CAP to the International Health Terminology Standards Development Organisation (IHTSDO) in order to promote international adoption and use of SNOMED CT. Now trading as SNOMED International, the organization is responsible for "ongoing maintenance, development, quality assurance, and distribution of SNOMED CT" internationally
and its Membership consists of a number of the world's leading e-health countries and territories, including: Argentina, Australia, Belgium, Brunei, Canada, Czech Republic, Chile, Denmark, Estonia, Hong Kong, Iceland, India, Ireland, Israel, Lithuania, Malaysia, Malta, Netherlands, New Zealand, Norway, Poland, Portugal, Singapore, Slovak Republic, Republic of Slovenia, Spain, Sweden, Switzerland, United Kingdom, United States and Uruguay.

SNOMED CT is a multinational and multilingual terminology, which can manage different languages and dialects. SNOMED CT is currently available in American English, British English, Spanish, Danish and Swedish, with other translations underway or nearly completed in French and Dutch.  SNOMED CT cross maps to other terminologies, such as: ICD-9-CM, ICD-10, ICD-O-3, ICD-10-AM, Laboratory LOINC and OPCS-4. It supports ANSI, DICOM, HL7, and ISO standards.

Structure 
SNOMED CT consists of four primary core components:
 Concept Codes – numerical codes that identify clinical terms, primitive or defined, organized in hierarchies
 Descriptions – textual descriptions of Concept Codes
 Relationships – relationships between Concept Codes that have a related meaning
 Reference Sets – used to group Concepts or Descriptions into sets, including reference sets and cross-maps to other classifications and standards.

SNOMED CT "Concepts" are representational units that categorize all the things that characterize healthcare processes and need to be recorded therein. In 2011, SNOMED CT included more than 311,000 concepts, which are uniquely identified by a concept ID, e.g. the concept 22298006 refers to Myocardial infarction. All SNOMED CT concepts are organized into acyclic taxonomic (is-a) hierarchies; for example, Viral pneumonia IS-A Infectious pneumonia IS-A Pneumonia IS-A Lung disease.  Concepts may have multiple parents, for example Infectious pneumonia is also a child of Infectious disease. The taxonomic structure allows data to be recorded and later accessed at different levels of aggregation.
SNOMED CT concepts are linked by approximately 1,360,000 links, called relationships.

Concepts are further described by various clinical terms or phrases, called Descriptions, which are divided into Fully Specified Names (FSNs), Preferred Terms (PTs), and Synonyms.  Each Concept has exactly one FSN, which is unique across all of SNOMED CT. It has, in addition, exactly one PT, which has been decided by a group of clinicians to be the most common way of expressing the meaning of the concept. It may have zero to many Synonyms. Synonyms are additional terms and phrases used to refer to this concept. They do not have to be unique or unambiguous.

Semantic tag 
SNOMED CT assigns each concept a semantic tag. It is present in parenthesis in Fully Specified Name of each concept. There can be multiple semantic tags used within each SNOMED CT top level hierarchy. For example, top level hierarchy of Pharmaceutical/biologic Product uses semantic tags of: product, medicinal product, medicinal product form and clinical drug. Only one semantic tag can be used for each concept.

The formal model underlying SNOMED CT 

SNOMED CT can be characterized as a multilingual thesaurus with an ontological foundation. Thesaurus-like features are concept–term relations such as the synonymous descriptions "Acute coryza", "Acute nasal catarrh", "Acute rhinitis", "Common cold" (as well as Spanish "resfrío común" and "rinitis infecciosa") for the concept 82272006.

Under ontological scrutiny, SNOMED-CT is a class hierarchy (with extensive overlap of classes in contrast to typical statistical classifications like ICD).
This means that the SNOMED CT concept 82272006 defines the class of all the individual disease instances that match the criteria for "common cold" (e.g., one patient may have "head cold" noted in their record, and another may have "Acute coryza"; both can be found as instances of "common cold").
The superclass (Is-A) Relation relates classes in terms of inclusion of their members. That is, all individual "cold-processes" are also included in all superclasses of the class Common Cold, such as Viral upper respiratory tract infection (Figure).

SNOMED CT's relational statements are basically triplets of the form Concept1 – Relationx – Concept2, with Relationx being from a small number of relation types (called linkage concepts), e.g. finding site, due to, etc. The interpretation of these triplets is (implicitly) based on the semantics of a simple Description logic (DL). E.g., the triplet Common Cold – causative agent – Virus, corresponds to the first-order expression

forall x:  instance-of (x, Common cold) ->  exists y: instance-of (y, Virus) and causative-agent (y, x)

or the more intuitive DL expression

Common cold subClassOf causative-agent some Virus

In the Common cold example the concept description is "primitive", which means that necessary criteria are given that must be met for each instance, without being sufficient for classifying a disorder as an instance of Common Cold . In contrast, the example Viral upper respiratory tract infection depicts a fully described concept, which is represented in description logic as follows:

  Viral upper respiratory tract infection equivalentTo
  	Upper respiratory infection and Viral respiratory infection and
  		Causative-agent some Virus and
  		Finding-site some Upper respiratory tract structure and
  		Pathological-process some Infectious process

This means that each and every individual disorder for which all definitional criteria are met can be classified as an instance of Viral upper respiratory tract infection.

Description logics 
As of 2021, SNOMED CT content limits itself to a subset of the EL++ formalism, restricting itself to the following operators:
Top, bottom
Primitive roles and concepts with asserted parent(s) for each
Concept definition and conjunction but NOT disjunction or negation
Role hierarchy but not role composition
Domain and range constraints
Existential but not universal restriction
A restricted form of role inclusion axiom (xRy ^ ySz => xRz)
General Concept Inclusion axioms (A ⊆ B).

For understanding the modelling, it is also important to look at the stated view of a concept versus the inferred view of the concept. In further considering the state view, SNOMED CT used in the past a modelling approach referred to as 'proximal parent' approach. After 2015, a superior approach called "proximal primitive parent" has been adopted.

Precoordination and postcoordination 

SNOMED CT provides a compositional syntax that can be used to create expressions that represent clinical ideas which are not explicitly represented by SNOMED CT concepts. This mechanism exists because it is challenging to create and maintain all possible concepts upfront (as precoordinated concepts).

For example, there is no explicit concept for a "third degree burn of left index finger caused by hot water". However, using the compositional syntax it can be represented as

 284196006 | burn of skin | :
    116676008 | associated morphology | = 80247002 | third degree burn injury |
  , 272741003 | laterality | = 7771000 | left |
  , 246075003 | causative agent | = 47448006 | hot water |
  , 363698007 | finding site | = 83738005 | index finger structure

Such expressions are said to have been 'postcoordinated'.  Post-coordination avoids the need to create large numbers of defined Concepts within SNOMED CT.  However, many systems only allow for precoordinated representations. Reliable analysis and comparison of post-coordinated expressions is possible using appropriate algorithms machinery to efficiently process the expression taking account of the underlying description logic.

Major Electronic Health Record Systems (EHRS) have repeatedly complained to IHTSDO and other standards organizations about the "complexity" of post-coordinated expressions.

For example, the postcoordinated expression above can be transformed using a set of standard rules to the following "normal form expression" which enables comparison with similar concepts.

 64572001 | disease | :
    246075003 | causative agent | = 47448006 | hot water |
  , 363698007 | finding site | = ( 83738005 | index finger structure | :
           272741003 | laterality | = 7771000 | left | )
  , { 116676008 | associated morphology | = 80247002 | third degree burn injury |
  , 363698007 | finding site | = 39937001 | skin structure | }
Postcoordination is an important desirable feature of a terminology. Prior 2020, International Classification of Diseases (ICD) did not allow post-coordination and SNOMED CT was the only terminology that supported postcoordination. Since 2020, a new version of  ICD-11 now also supports postcoordination.

Veterinary content 

The International Edition of SNOMED CT only includes human terms. In 2014, clearly veterinary concepts were moved into a SNOMED CT veterinary extension. This extension is managed by the Veterinary Terminology Services Lab at the Va-Md College of Veterinary Medicine at Virginia Tech.

Known deficiencies and mitigation strategies 
Earlier SNOMED versions had faceted structure ordered by semantic axes, requiring that more complex situations required to be coded by a coordination of different codes. This had two major shortcomings. On the one hand, the necessity of post-coordination was perceived as a user-unfriendly obstacle, which has certainly contributed to the rather low adoption of early SNOMED versions. On the other hand, uniform coding was difficult to obtain. E.g.,Acute appendicitis could be post-coordinated in three different ways with no means to compute semantic equivalences.
SNOMED RT had addressed this problem by introducing description logic formula. With the addition of CTV3 a large number of concepts were redefined using formal expressions.  However, the fusion with CTV3, as a historically grown terminology with many close-to user descriptions, introduced some problems which still affect SNOMED CT. In addition to a confusing taxonomic web of many hierarchical levels with massive multiple inheritance (e.g. there are 36 taxonomic ancestors for Acute appendicitis), many ambiguous, context-dependent concepts have found their way into SNOMED CT. Pre-coordination was sometimes pushed to extremes, so there are, for example, 350 different concepts for burns found on the head.

A further phenomenon which characterizes parts of SNOMED CT is the so-called epistemic intrusion.
In principle, the task of terminology (and even an ontology) should be limited to providing context-free term or class meanings. The contextualization of these representational units should be ideally the task of an information model.
Human language is misleading here, as we use syntactically similar expression to represent categorically distinct entities, e.g. Ectopic pregnancy vs. Suspected pregnancy.  The first one refers to a real pregnancy, the second one to a piece of (uncertain) information.  In SNOMED CT most (but not all) of these context-dependent concepts are concentrated in the subhierachy Situation with explicit context. A major reason for why such concepts cannot be dispensed with is that SNOMED CT takes on, in many cases, the functionality of information models, as the latter do not exist in a given implementation.

With the establishment of IHTSDO, SNOMED CT became more accessible to a wider audience. Criticism of the state of the terminology was sparked by numerous substantive weaknesses as well as on the lack of quality assurance measures. From the beginning IHTSDO was open regarding such (also academic) criticism. In the last few years considerable progress has been made regarding quality assurance and tooling.

The need for a more principled ontological foundation was gradually accepted, as well as a better understanding of description logic semantics. Redesign priorities were formulated regarding observables, disorders, findings, substances, organisms etc. Translation guidelines were elaborated as well as guidelines for content submission requests and a strategy for the inclusion of pre-coordinated content. There are still known deficiencies regarding the "ontological commitment" of SNOMED CT, e.g., the clarification of which kind of entity is an instance of a given SNOMED CT concept. The same term can be interpreted as a disorder or a patient with a disorder, for example Tumour might denote a process or a piece of tissue; Allergy may denote an allergic reaction or just an allergic disposition. A more recent strategy is the use of rigorously typed upper-level ontologies to disambiguate SNOMED CT content.

The increased take-up of SNOMED CT for research into applications in daily use across the world to support patient care is leading to a larger engaged community. This has led to an increase in the resource allocated to authoring SNOMED CT terms as well as to an increase in collaboration to take SNOMED CT into a robust industry used standard. This is leading to an increase in the number of software tools and development of materials that contribute to knowledge base to support implementation. A number of on-line communities that focus on particular aspects of SNOMED CT and its implementation are also developing.

In theory, description logic reasoning can be applied to any new candidate post-coordinated expressions in order to assess whether it is a parent or ancestor of, a child or other descendant of, or semantically equivalent to any existing concept from the existing pre-coordinated concepts. However, partly as the continuing fall-out from the merger with CTV3, SNOMED still contains undiscovered semantically duplicate primitive and defined concepts. Additionally, many concepts remain primitive whilst their semantics can also be legitimately defined in terms of other primitives and roles concurrently in the system. Because of these omissions and actual or possible redundancies of semantic content, real-world performance of algorithms to infer subsumption or semantic equivalence will be unpredictably imperfect.

SNOMED CT validation 
Using consistent rules is important for the quality of SNOMED CT. To that end, in 2009, a prototype Machine Readable Concept Model (MRCM) was created by the SNOMED CT team. In a follow up work, this model is being revised to utilize SNOMED CT expression constraints.

SNOMED CT and other terminologies

SNOMED CT and ICD 
SNOMED CT is a clinical terminology designed to capture and represent patient data for clinical purposes. The International Statistical Classification of Diseases and Related Health Problems (ICD) is an internationally used medical classification system; which is used to assign diagnostic and, in some national modifications, procedural codes in order to produce coded data for statistical analysis, epidemiology, reimbursement and resource allocation. Both systems use standardized definitions and form a common medical language used within electronic health record (EHR) systems. SNOMED CT enables information input into an EHR system during the course of patient care, while ICD facilitates information retrieval, or output, for secondary data purposes. In 2010s, the advantage of SNOMED CT over ICD was the multiple parent hierarchy of SNOMED CT. Since 2020 release of ICD 11, this advantage is less important because ICD-11 foundational level allows an ICD 11 concept to have multiple parents.

SNOMED CT and LOINC 
LOINC is a terminology that contains laboratory tests. Since 2017, SNOMED International started creating terms for LOINC components and created a set of SNOMED CT expressions that capture the meaning of many LOINC terms.

SNOMED CT and MedDRA 
There is overlap between MedDRA and SNOMED CT that is not beneficial for pharmaceutical industry. In 2021, two maps map between SNOMED CT and MedDRA were jointly published by both organizations (from SNOMED CT to MedDRA and from MedDRA to SNOMED CT).

Use 
SNOMED CT is used in a number of different ways, some of which are:
 It captures clinical information at the level of detail needed for the provision of healthcare
 Through sharing data it can reduce the need to repeat health history at each new encounter with a healthcare professional
 Information can be recorded by different people in different locations and combined into simple information views within the patient record
 Use of a common terminology decreases the potential for differing interpretation of information
 Electronic recording in a common way reduces errors and can help to ensure completeness in recording all relevant data
 Standardised information makes analysis easier, supporting quality, cost effective practice, research and future clinical guideline development
 A clinical terminology allows a health care provider to identify patients based on specified coded information, and more effectively manage screening, treatment and follow up

Use cases 
More specifically, the following sample computer applications use SNOMED CT:

Electronic Health Record Systems
Computerized Provider Order Entry CPOE such as E-Prescribing or Laboratory Order Entry
Catalogues of clinical services; e.g., for Diagnostic Imaging procedures
Knowledge databases used in clinical decision support systems (CDSS)
Remote Intensive Care Unit Monitoring
Laboratory Reporting
Emergency Room Charting
Cancer Reporting
Genetic Databases

Access 
SNOMED CT is maintained and distributed by SNOMED International, an international non-profit standards development organization, located in London, UK..

The use of SNOMED CT in production systems requires a license. There are two types of license:
 Country/territory membership in SNOMED International (charged according to gross national product).
 Affiliate license (dependent on the number of end users). LDCs (least developed countries) can use SNOMED CT without charges.

For scientific research in medical informatics, for demonstrations or evaluation purposes SNOMED CT sources can be freely downloaded and used. The original SNOMED CT sources in tabular form are accessible by registered users of the Unified Medical Language System (UMLS) who have signed an agreement. Numerous online and offline browsers are available.

Those wishing to obtain a license for its use and to download SNOMED CT should contact their National Release Centre, links to which are provided on the IHTSDO website.

License free subsets 
To facilitate adoption of SNOMED CT and use of SNOMED CT in other standards, there are license free subsets. For example, a set of 7 314 codes and descriptions is free for use by users of DICOM-compliant software (without restriction to IHTSDO member countries).

Global Patient Set (GPS) subset 
GPS was released in Sep 2019 and contains 21 782 concepts.

Top level concepts 
SNOMED CT concepts typically belong to a single hierarchy (with the exception of drug-device combined concepts). Some hierarchies, have a concept model defined (e.g., clinical findings). For other domains (e.g., Organism, Substance, Qualifier value), there is no concept model yet defined.

Procedure 

Concept in this hierarchy represent procedures performed on a patient. There is a well established defined concept model for procedures. Procedure site (direct or indirect) specifies on what part of body the procedure is performed. A separate set of rules exist for evaluation procedures. Evaluation procedures are procedures where evidence is evaluated to  support the determination of a value, inference or conclusion. Evaluation procedures have additional attributes, such as 'Has specimen','Property' or 'Measurement method'.

Event 
As of 2016, the Event hierarchy does not have a concept model defined. In 2006, some concepts from the 'Clinical Finding' hierarchy were moved to the Event hierarchy. Those concepts retained some of their attributes. (e.g., causative agent)

Observable entities 
SNOMED International is working on creating a concept model for observable entities.

Body Structure 
Body parts represent one of the largest  hierarchies within SNOMED CT. The modeling is based on Foundational Model of Anatomy but it differs from the model in some aspects (e.g., region is taken as 3D region and not a 2D region). Important attributes include: 'Laterality', several types of 'Part of' relationships, and 'Is a'.

Pharmaceutical / biologic product 

Pharmaceutical and biologic products are modeled using constructs of active ingredient, presentation strength, and basis of strength. Since 2018, harmonization of SNOMED CT drug content with IDMP standard is an editorial goal. The following types of entities are present:

Medicinal product 
A higher level term grouping drugs. For example, 398731002 | Product containing sulfamethoxazole and
trimethoprim (medicinal product) |

Clinical Drug 
Concept that represents a concrete drug product as used in clinical practice. For example, 317335000 | Product containing precisely esomeprazole 20milligram/1 each conventional release oral tablet (clinical drug)|

Dose Form 
Concept representing how the product is delivered. For example, 385219001 | Conventional release solution for injection (dose form) |.

Authoring conventions 
A goal for SNOMED CT is consistency. Several mechanisms are employed to ensure this. Machine readable concept model is used to check for compliance with a set of rules. Rules for creating fully specified name for a concept define allowed and not allowed patterns. When defining a concept, a proximal primitive parent rule is used (in stated definition) to employ best description logic derived classification of concepts.

Separate conventions govern grouping of relationships. Ability to group related relationships is an important strength of SNOMED CT. Rules in Machine Readable Concept Model (MRCM) specify by domain which relationships are never grouped (e.g., 'Is a' or 'Laterality' attributes) and which relationships are always grouped (e.g., 'Finding site'). For correct subsumption inference, some relationships may be in a group but consist of a single relationship.

Another convention for SNOMED CT international edition is to avoid creating intermediate primitive concepts (unless medically necessary and impossible to define with existing concept model). An intermediate primitive (=not defined) concept is a non-defined concept that has children concepts and parent concepts. This convention is related to the use of description logic to facilitate terminology maintenance. Because primitive concepts can not be processed by the description logic classifier, the maintenance of such concepts relies solely on human editors. Adding new intermediate primitive concepts requires changes to all affected concepts and is demanding in terms of terminology maintenance.

See also 
CDISC
Clinical Care Classification System
DOCLE
EN 13606
MEDCIN
MedDRA
Omaha System
ICD11
Foundational Model of Anatomy

Notes

References

External links 
SNOMED International website
SNOMED International's online browsers for SNOMED CT
US National Library of Medicine SNOMED CT resources
NHS Digital SNOMED CT resources
Veterinary Extension of SNOMED CT

Medical classification
Diagnosis classification
Nursing classification
Standards for electronic health records
Anatomical terminology